Homer Reed Gilbert, who sometimes played under the name Knuckles Boyle (August 17, 1909 – January 26, 1943) was an American football tackle who played one season with the New York Giants of the National Football League. He attended Albright College and Shippensburg State Teachers College. Gilbert also attended Harrisburg Technical High School in Harrisburg, Pennsylvania and the New York Military Academy in Cornwall-on-Hudson, New York. He was also a member of the Reading Keys and Pittsburgh Americans. He was a member of the New York Giants team that won the 1934 NFL Championship. Gilbert used the alias "Knuckles Boyle" because he could not be enrolled at Albright College and play professional football at the same time. "Boyles" was the name of a friend and he gained the name "Knuckles" for his toughness on the football field. He also played baseball in the New York-Pennsylvania League. Gilbert was the freshman football coach of Franklin and Marshall College in 1938. He also served as a police officer in Mechanicsburg, Pennsylvania. He died of a heart attack while on duty on August 26, 1943.

References

External links
Just Sports Stats
Officer Down Memorial Page

1909 births
1943 deaths
Players of American football from Pennsylvania
American football tackles
New York Military Academy alumni
Shippensburg University of Pennsylvania alumni
Albright Lions football players
New York Giants players
Reading Keys players
Pittsburgh Americans players
People from Luzerne County, Pennsylvania